In Somalia, freedom of speech and freedom of the media is guaranteed under the Somali Constitution established when the Federal Government was established in 2012. However, while there are swathes of blogs along with nearly 100 established media outlets, the culture of journalism has been violated with violence, arbitrary arrests, persecution, and suppression of the media.

Background

After the collapse of the central government and the start of the civil war in the early 1990s, media in Somalia was essentially unregulated. Journalists had unrestricted freedom to write and publish stories without editorial oversight, and many took an active role in the conflict's propaganda battle. The National Union of Somali Journalists was formed in 2002, in response to an attempt by the short-lived Transitional National Government to re-establish regulation over the industry through what NUSOJ characterized as a "repressive" media law.

Prior to the capital Mogadishu's pacification by the Somali National Army in mid-2011, the independent Radio Shabelle and HornAfrik, among other Somali media outlets, were frequently targeted by Islamist militants. The ousted insurgents subsequently resorted to issuing death threats and targeted assassinations in order to discourage reporting on their activities. Due to frustration at the increasing number of expatriate journalists returning to the capital after the relative improvement in security, the militants in 2012 intensified their anti-media campaign, killing a record 18 reporters during the year. Reporters Without Borders cited 2012's death toll as the main reason behind its placement of Somalia at 175 in its 2013 Press Freedom Index of 179 countries, an eleven-point drop in ranking from 2011.

In total, an estimated 49 radio, print and television reporters operating within the country died between 1992 and 2013. According to the Committee to Protect Journalists, the majority were locally based (73%), male (96%), broadcast journalists (45%), worked on the radio (65%), and were non-freelance (82%). Most were assassinated (65%), while covering primarily war (49%) and political stories (55%). A number also received threats prior to their deaths (22%). The sources of fire were largely political action groups (50%), mainly Al-Shabaab; the assailants' affiliations were unknown in only 22% of the cases.

The Federal Government of Somalia was established on August 1, 2012, representing the first permanent central government in the country since the start of the civil war. A Federal Parliament was also formed, a new constitution was adopted, and government courts were set up for the first time in many years.

Significant events

Charges of insulting state institutions and coaxing false testimony overturned 

In January 2013, senior Radio Dalsan reporter Abdiaziz Abdinur Ibrahim was detained in the capital after interviewing an alleged victim of sexual assault, and tried on charges of insulting state institutions and coaxing false testimony out of the interviewee. The two were convicted by a local court in early February, with both their cases later the same month overturned by an appeals tribunal and the apex court due to lack of evidence.

Efforts to improve press mobility and security

In 2013 there were efforts to improve press mobility and security by Somali government forces who were assisted by AMISOM soldiers. They concurrently conducted several large sweeps in Mogadishu, seizing weapons and arresting 1,700 and 730 suspected Al-Shabaab associates during two separate operations. According to the CPJ, the number of slain journalists had dropped significantly by the end of 2013, with only four reporters killed during the year. The federal authorities also established a task force to investigate allegations of journalist harassment, and facilitated talks between domestic and international media representatives for the drafting of a new Somali media law.

Deterioration of press freedom 
Amnesty International produced a report in February 2020 titled "We live in perpetual fear" which focuses on deterioration of press freedom in the country since President Mohamed Abdullahi Mohamed took office in February 2017.

In April 2020, prominent VOA journalist Harun Maruf was allegedly harassed and threatened by NISA under charges of undermining unity and having connections with al-Shabaab. The US Embassy in Somalia subsequently defended his journalism, citing NISA actions as attacking press freedom.

In April 2020, Laetitia Bader, the Horn of Africa director for Human Rights Watch, appealed to the Somali authorities to 'stop jailing and harassing journalists,' highlighting the fact that it is a particularly crucial time for accurate news dissemination to the public due to the upcoming elections as well as COVID-19.

In May 2020 the International Press Institute wrote an open letter to President Mohamed expressing concern at harassment, intimidation and arrest of independent journalists and media outlets.

Arbitrary arrests and persecution of journalists 

In February 2021 there were arbitrary arrest of journalists following protests in Mogadishu over delays in elections. Journalist were threatened and intimidated at gunpoint, denied access and their equipment was confiscated by government forces.

In March 2021, Amnesty International called on the Somali authorities to bring an end to the arbitrary arrest and persecution of journalists in Puntland, prior to the presidential and parliamentary elections:

Later in March 2021, Puntland president Said Abdullahi Deni issued a pardon to journalist Kilwe Adan Farah who had been sentenced to three years, having spent 90 days in prison. The National Union of Somali Journalists (NUSOJ) welcomed his release saying, "Kilwe Adan Farah should never have been detained, let alone convicted of any crime. He continues to be innocent and was merely targeted for doing journalism."

References

Somalia
Mass media in Somalia